Hexahydroxydiphenic acid is an organic compound with the formula [(HO)3C6HCO2H]2. It is the oxidatively coupled derivative of gallic acid It is a white solid, although samples are typically brown owing to oxidation.

Hexahydroxydiphenic acid is a component of some ellagitannins, such as casuarictin. Luteic acid is the monolactone and ellagic acid is the dilactone of hexahydroxydiphenic acid.

See also 
 Diphenic acid

References 

Ellagitannins
Pyrogallols
Biphenyls
Hydroxybenzoic acids